The Kokoda Challenge is Australia’s premier cross country team event, a punishing 96 km of hills and bushwalking that takes place in the Gold Coast hinterland in July of each year.

Participants trek a 96 km cross country course, walking along fire trails, crossing 12 creeks and climbing 5,000m of vertical elevation, within 39 hours. The goal is to finish as a complete team of four in honour of the spirit forged on the Kokoda Track in 1942: mateship, endurance, courage and sacrifice.

96 km is the original Kokoda Track length and the time limit represents the 39th Battalion, one the infantry units of the Australian Army who fought during the Kokoda Track campaign.

Course

Participants trek a 96 km course that leads along fire trails, crosses 12 creeks and summits 5,000m of vertical elevation.

96 km is the actual distance of the Kokoda Track in Papua New Guinea. The 39-hour time limit is in honour of the 39th Militia, the first Australian Troops to set foot on the Kokoda Track.

There are 14 Major Checkpoints along the 96 km course. Starting in the Gold Coast Hinterland suburb of Mudgeeraba, the track follows selected fire trails and paths through Austinville, Springbrook, Numinbah Valley, Lower Beechmont and Clagiraba to the finish line at the Nerang Velodrome.

Charity
The Kokoda Challenge Association is a registered charity, providing funds for  Youth Program (KCYP), teaching young people the fundamental philosophy of the Spirit of Kokoda, and how their achievements in life are directly related to the effort they contribute.
The program for The Kokoda Kids is a 14-month commitment - the first 20 weeks consisting of training and team building activities to develop physical fitness and prepare them for the challenge of a lifetime – walking The Kokoda Track in Papua New Guinea.

Established by Doug Henderson and his wife Anna, the initial goal was to raise awareness of the World War II Kokoda Campaign in New Guinea in 1942; and use the 'Spirit of Kokoda' to help young Australian's reach their full potential.

Teaming up with a handful of members from the  Bushwalking Club,  Association held the first walk in the  Hinterland in July 2005.  This event was the sole fundraiser for the first  Youth Program, which trained and supported 12 young people to walk the Kokoda Track that year in Papua New Guinea.

By identify young Australians at a crossroads in their life, the Association provides support to help them reach their potential through  Youth Program.

The Association Values include:

•  Endurance: Testing endurance to promote personal growth

•  Courage: Supporting and encouraging participants to stay the course, even when times are tough

•  Sacrifice: An organisation that is built on the sacrifice of volunteers and the community spirit this inspires

•  Mateship: The value of teamwork and of providing support for each other.

•  Environment: Valuing the natural environment and achieving minimal environmental impact.

•  Youth: Belief in the potential of youth to create a positive future

References

External links

 96 km Kokoda Challenge Race is held in Papua New Guinea last weekend of August across the infamous Kokoda Trail.  It is not a team event but an individual event.  The record holder in both directions is Brendan Buka. *

In August 2012 checkpoints were as follows:  Isurava Village;  Eora Creek;  1900/Myola Junction;  Kagi;  Efogi;  Menari;  Maguli Range;  Ioribaiwa; finish at Owers' Corner

Endurance games
Challenge walks
Sport in Papua New Guinea
Recurring sporting events established in 2005
2005 establishments in Australia
Sports competitions in Queensland